Speedy protein A is a protein that in humans is encoded by the SPDYA gene.

Interactions 

SPDYA has been shown to interact with CDKN1B.

References

Further reading